Old Hill railway station is in Old Hill, West Midlands, England, on the Birmingham-Stourbridge line. It is managed by West Midlands Trains, who provide the majority of train services; Chiltern Railways also operate a small number.

History
The station, which opened in 1866, was historically part of the Great Western Railway, and was at the junction of the line from Birmingham to Stourbridge Junction with lines to Dudley and via Halesowen to Longbridge. The two latter lines have long since been closed.  The original station buildings have also been removed.

Because it was a junction station, the platforms were staggered, with the Birmingham-bound platform offset by a short distance.

A further junction in the Stourbridge direction allowed trains to traverse the Bumble Hole Line, which ran to Dudley. That line closed in 1964.

To the east of the current station were private railway sidings serving Palmer Timber's Yard, which have long been removed.

The original timber station buildings were badly damaged by fire on 13 September 1967, and that prompted the modernisation of station, with the new building opening on 22 May 1968. The station footbridge was moved to different location from that of the original one, which was towards the Stourbridge end of the platform.

With rationalising of signalling, the signal box that served Old Hill was demolished in 1973.

Services
The typical Monday-Saturday daytime service is every 30 minutes, between Stourbridge Junction and Stratford-upon-Avon via Birmingham Snow Hill.

On Sundays, trains are hourly.

Chiltern Railways only operate one service per weekday from this station, the 21:10 Marylebone to Stourbridge Junction, which departs from Old Hill at 23:36 on Mondays to Fridays only.

References

Further reading

External links

Rail Around Birmingham and the West Midlands: Old Hill station

Railway stations in Sandwell
DfT Category E stations
Former Great Western Railway stations
Railway stations in Great Britain opened in 1866
Railway stations served by Chiltern Railways
Railway stations served by West Midlands Trains